Dominique Gaspard (22 December 1884 - 6 February 1938) was an American-born creole  physician who moved to Quebec in his youth and stayed until his death, having contributed greatly to the medical and black community.

Education
In 1904, Gaspard was encouraged to enter the Saint-Hyacinthe Seminary near Montreal, Quebec. The seminary had begun accepting black students in the 1860s, and Gaspard applied with a letter of recommendation from Charles Uncles, a previous graduate. 
Upon completion of his studies at the Saint Hyacinthe seminary in 1911, Gaspard wished to enter into the order of Dominican priests but was turned down due to his skin colour. He instead applied to the University of Laval in Montreal (later known as the University of Montreal) to study medicine. His studies were interrupted by the outbreak of World War I when Gaspard worked as a medical volunteer with the Canadian Expeditionary Force at a field hospital in France. He received the Médaille des épidémies (“epidemic medal”)  from the French minister of war. He returned to Montreal in 1917 and completed his medical degree a year later. He set up a practice in Old Montreal and was a founding member of the NCC.

Personal life

He married Ethel May Lyons in 1921.  He died in Hôpital de Verdun in 1938, and was buried in Notre Dame des Neiges Cemetery.

Legacy
In April 1917, Gaspard was awarded "La Médaille des épidémies du ministère de la Guerre", by Paul Painlevé, the French Minister of War.

In 1927, Gaspard became a founding member of the Negro Community Centre of Montreal.

In 1935, Gaspard was one of 15 men who made the initial application to establish the Coloured Veterans’ Legion in the St. Antoine district. The Coloured War Veterans Branch (Quebec no. 50) received its charter from Dominion Command in Ottawa on March 20, 1935 and opened its doors at 1450 St. Antoine.

On April 13, 1953, the name of (Quebec no. 50) was changed from the Coloured War Veterans’ Branch to Dr. Gaspard Royal Canadian Legion Branch no. 50.

References

Physicians from Louisiana
Canadian military doctors
American emigrants to Canada
Université de Montréal alumni
1884 births
1938 deaths
Black Canadian people
Canadian people of African-American descent
People from New Orleans
20th-century Canadian physicians
Canadian people of World War I
Physicians from Montreal